"Bones" is a song by American pop rock band Imagine Dragons. The song was released through Interscope and Kidinakorner on March 11, 2022, as the lead single from the band's sixth studio album, Mercury – Acts 1 & 2. It was written by Dan Reynolds, Wayne Sermon, Ben McKee, Daniel Platzman, and its producers Mattman & Robin.

Background and release 
On March 9, 2022, the band posted to their social media, asking fans to head over to their official Discord server at 3:00PST for a surprise.  The band's manager and frontman Dan Reynolds' brother, Mac, sent a WAV file containing the first 13 seconds of "Bones".  The next day, the band announced on TikTok that the song would be released on March 11. The day afterward, the song was featured in the teaser for the third season of the Amazon Prime Video series, The Boys.

Upon the song's release, Reynolds stated to Rolling Stone, "'Bones' is a reflection of my constant obsession with the finality and fragility of life.  I'm always in search of some evidence that will convince me that there is more to come—that life is truly eternal in some sense. Having yet to find that, I try to at least dream of what conquering death would feel like in a song."

Music video 
On April 6, 2022, the band released an official music video for the song, directed by Jason Koenig. The video draws influences from The Wolf of Wall Street and Michael Jackson's "Thriller" music video. The video stars frontman Dan Reynolds as an egoistic Wall Street day trader, while the other band members star as coworkers. However, all the workers suddenly turn into dancing zombies, who chase Reynolds around the office. Reynolds is then hypnotized into joining the zombies' dance performance, before the spell breaks, he gets caught, and is decapitated.

Charts

Weekly charts

Monthly charts

Year-end charts

Certifications

Release history

References 

2022 singles
2022 songs
Imagine Dragons songs
Song recordings produced by Mattman & Robin
Songs written by Dan Reynolds (musician)
Songs written by Wayne Sermon
Songs written by Ben McKee
Songs written by Daniel Platzman
Songs written by Mattias Larsson
Songs written by Robin Fredriksson
Kidinakorner singles
Interscope Records singles